Olli Palola (born 8 April 1988) is a Finnish professional ice hockey forward who currently plays professionally for Timrå IK of the Swedish Hockey League (SHL).

Playing career 
Palola saw his first action in the Finnish top-flight Liiga during the 2006–07 season, playing six contests for Ilves. He then spent four years with fellow Liiga team Lukko, helping the team to a third-place finish in 2010–11. After having transferred to Tappara, he made it to the 2013 and 2014 Liiga finals with the team. During the 2013-14 campaign, Palola scored 30 goals and dealt out 26 assists in 80 games and was presented with the Aarne Honkavaara Trophy as the league's best goalscorer. He won the award also the following season (2014–15) after tallying 40 goals and 25 assists in 80 games en route to another Liiga runner-up finish.

Palola then opted to continue his career in the Kontinental Hockey League (KHL), he signed with HC Vityaz for the 2015–16 season. His number went down in Russia: He saw the ice in 27 KHL games, scoring one goal and dishing out four assists.

In May 2016, he signed a contract with the Växjö Lakers of the Swedish Hockey League (SHL). After returning to the KHL the following season with Jokerit, Palola signed as a free agent to a one-year contract with Chinese outfit, Kunlun Red Star, for the 2018–19 season on May 2, 2018.

International play 

Palola won his first caps for Finland's men's national team during the 2013–14 season: He played at the Euro Hockey Tour and won a silver medal with Team Finland at the 2014 IIHF World Championships in Minsk. Palola made ten appearances during the tournament, chipping in with four goals.

Career statistics

Regular season and playoffs

International

References

External links

1988 births
Living people
Sportspeople from Oulu
Finnish expatriate ice hockey players in China
Finnish ice hockey forwards
HIFK (ice hockey) players
Ilves players
Jokerit players
HC Kunlun Red Star players
Lukko players
Rögle BK players
Tappara players
Timrå IK players
Vaasan Sport players
Växjö Lakers players
HC Vityaz players